Chasmina fasciculosa is a moth of the family Noctuidae first described by Francis Walker in 1858. It is found in Sri Lanka, Hong Kong, the Philippines and China.

References

Moths of Asia
Moths described in 1858
Hadeninae